The women's heptathlon at the 2018 IAAF World U20 Championships was held at Ratina Stadium on 12 and 13 July.

Records

Results

References

heptathlon
Combined events at the World Athletics U20 Championships